The Cronulla-Sutherland District Rugby Football League (Cronulla-Sutherland District Junior Rugby Football League in the case of junior football) is an amateur competition for rugby league clubs in and around the Sutherland Shire district of New South Wales, Australia.

The Cronulla-Sutherland District Rugby Football League was formed in the early 1950s following the formation of several new Sutherland Shire based clubs and the arrangement of a committee that would eventually become the CSDRFL. All Shire based clubs had previously played in several Inter-District matches throughout the year but with the formation of a localised Sutherland league these were no longer deemed necessary.

The Cronulla-Sutherland Junior District Rugby Football League was formed in 1963 after a general meeting among several of the already established junior clubs whom decided it would be beneficial to form and arrange an annual competition amongst themselves and other teams in the Sutherland Shire.

Since its inception several new teams have gradually joined the association where the team numbers now stand at a total of sixteen clubs.

Current Open Age Clubs

2023 Southern Open Age

District clubs

Notable players
Since the establishments of both the CSDRFL and the CSDJRFL many local players have gone on to play first grade for many of the Australian and overseas professional teams contained in the National Rugby League and the Super League.

The vast majority of these players have usually gone on to appear for both the local sides in the area; the Cronulla-Sutherland Sharks and the St. George Dragons/St George Illawarra Dragons.

Internationals

See also

 Balmain District Junior Rugby League
 Manly-Warringah/North Sydney District Rugby League
 Parramatta Junior Rugby League
 Penrith District Rugby League
 South Sydney District Junior Rugby Football League
 Sydney Roosters Juniors
 Rugby League Competitions in Australia

References

External links
Sporting Pulse Official page

Rugby league competitions in New South Wales
Rugby league in Sydney
Amateur rugby league
Sports leagues established in 1964
Cronulla-Sutherland Sharks
Cronulla, New South Wales
Sutherland Shire